is a Japanese actress. She appeared in Ring: Kanzenban, the 1995 TV movie adaptation of Koji Suzuki's novel Ring.

Filmography 
 Ring: Kanzenban (1995 TV) - Shizuka Asakawa
 Zero Woman: The Accused (1997 aka Zero Woman: Namae no nai onna) - Rei
 Kyōto sekushī yōkai satsujin annai (1997 TV)
 Keiji ichidai: Hiratsuka Hachibei no Shōwa jiken shi (2009 TV series) - Kichizō's wife
 Sakuya kono hana (2010) TV series

References

External links 
 

Year of birth missing (living people)
Living people
Japanese actresses